Tolga Sarıtaş (born 30 May 1991) is a Turkish actor. He is known for his roles as Şehzade Cihangir in Muhteşem Yüzyıl, Ali Mertoğlu in Güneşin Kızları, and Yavuz Karasu in the successful drama Söz. He played in ”Büyük Sürgün Kafkasya" mini historical series about Meskhetian Turks and crime series "Arıza" with Ayça Ayşin Turan  He has won numerous awards and was nominated for an International Emmy Award. Also he was final jury for choosing best lead actors in the 47th International Emmy Awards. In addition to his acting career, Sarıtaş has appeared in many advertising campaigns and won many awards in that category.

Filmography

Film

Web series

Tv Series

Awards and nominations

International

National

References

External links 
 Tolga Sarıtaş on IMDb

1991 births
Living people
Male actors from Istanbul
21st-century Turkish male actors
Golden Butterfly Award winners